A Midsummer Night's Dream is a 2016 British television film based on the William Shakespeare play A Midsummer Night's Dream. It was adapted by Russell T Davies, directed by David Kerr and produced by Nikki Wilson. It stars Maxine Peake as Titania, Matt Lucas as Bottom, John Hannah as Theseus and Nonso Anozie as Oberon. The film was first broadcast on 30 May 2016 on BBC One.

The film gained attention for its gay additions to the story, including a kiss between Hippolyta and Titania. Russell T Davies said, "I wanted to have a man with a man, a man who was dressed as a woman with a man, and a woman with a woman because it’s 2016, so that’s the world now."

The film received positive reviews. The Guardian called it "Doctor Who-ish but rather good" and said the ending "was infused with such a sense of sincere, undiluted joy that I found I had a lump in my throat". The Daily Telegraph gave it four out of five stars and said "Russell T Davies made Shakespeare engaging, fresh and funny".

Cast 

 Maxine Peake as Titania
 Nonso Anozie as Oberon
 Matt Lucas as Bottom
 John Hannah as Theseus
 Eleanor Matsuura as Hippolyta
 Hiran Abeysekera as Puck
 Prisca Bakare as Hermia
 Kate Kennedy as Helena
 Matthew Tennyson as Lysander
 Paapa Essiedu as Demetrius
 Elaine Paige as Mistress Quince
 Richard Wilson as Starveling
 Bernard Cribbins as Snout 
 Javone Prince as Snug
 Fisayo Akinade as Flute
 Colin McFarlane as Egeus
 Elliot Levey as Philostrate
 Charlotte Dylan as Cobweb
 Varada Sethu as Peaseblossom
 Tia Benbow-Hart as Moth
 Marlene Madenge as Mustardseed

References

External links 
 

2016 television films
2016 films
Films based on A Midsummer Night's Dream
BBC Television shows
British television films
Cultural history of the United Kingdom
Films directed by David Kerr (director)